Seq2seq is a family of machine learning approaches used for natural language processing. Applications include language translation, image captioning, conversational models and text summarization.

History 
The algorithm was proposed by Mikolov in his PhD thesis (p. 94 of https://www.fit.vut.cz/study/phd-thesis-file/283/283.pdf, https://www.fit.vut.cz/study/phd-thesis-file/283/283_o2.pdf). 

The algorithm was later developed by Google for use in machine translation.

In 2019, Facebook announced its use in symbolic integration and resolution of differential equations. The company claimed that it could solve complex equations more rapidly and with greater accuracy than commercial solutions such as Mathematica, MATLAB and Maple. First, the equation is parsed into a tree structure to avoid notational idiosyncrasies. An LSTM neural network then applies its standard pattern recognition facilities to process the tree.

In 2020, Google released Meena, a 2.6 billion parameter seq2seq-based chatbot trained on a 341 GB data set. Google claimed that the chatbot has 1.7 times greater model capacity than OpenAI's GPT-2, whose May 2020 successor, the  175 billion parameter GPT-3, trained on a "45TB dataset of plaintext words (45,000 GB) that was ... filtered down to 570 GB."

In 2022, Amazon introduced AlexaTM 20B, a moderate-sized (20 billion parameter) seq2seq language model. It uses an encoder-decoder to accomplish few-shot learning. The encoder outputs a representation of the input that the decoder uses as input to perform a specific task, such as translating the input into another language. The model outperforms the much larger GPT-3 in language translation and summarization. Training mixes denoising (appropriately inserting missing text in strings) and causal-language-modeling (meaningfully extending an input text). It allows adding features across different languages without massive training workflows. AlexaTM 20B achieved state-of-the-art performance in few-shot-learning tasks across all Flores-101 language pairs, outperforming GPT-3 on several tasks.

Technique 
Seq2seq turns one sequence into another sequence (sequence transformation). It does so by use of a recurrent neural network (RNN) or more often LSTM or GRU to avoid the problem of vanishing gradient. The context for each item is the output from the previous step. The primary components are one encoder and one decoder network. The encoder turns each item into a corresponding hidden vector containing the item and its context. The decoder reverses the process, turning the vector into an output item, using the previous output as the input context.

Optimizations include:

 Attention: The input to the decoder is a single vector which stores the entire context. Attention allows the decoder to look at the input sequence selectively.
 Beam Search: Instead of picking the single output (word) as the output, multiple highly probable choices are retained, structured as a tree (using a Softmax on the set of attention scores). Average the encoder states weighted by the attention distribution.
 Bucketing: Variable-length sequences are possible because of padding with 0s, which may be done to both input and output. However, if the sequence length is 100 and the input is just 3 items long, expensive space is wasted. Buckets can be of varying sizes  and specify both input and output lengths.

Training typically uses a cross-entropy loss function, whereby one output is penalized to the extent that the probability of the succeeding output is less than 1.

Related software 
Software adopting similar approaches includes OpenNMT (Torch), Neural Monkey (TensorFlow) and NEMATUS (Theano).

See also 

 Artificial neural network

References

External links 
 
 
 
 

Artificial neural networks
Natural language processing
Google software